Pierre Puvis de Chavannes (14 December 1824 – 24 October 1898) was a French painter known for his mural painting, who came to be known as "the painter for France". He became the co-founder and president of the Société Nationale des Beaux-Arts, and his work influenced many other artists, notably Robert Genin, and he aided medallists by designs and suggestions for their works. Puvis de Chavannes was a prominent painter in the early Third Republic. Émile Zola described his work as "an art made of reason, passion, and will".

Early life and education
Puvis de Chavannes was born Pierre-Cécile Puvis in a suburb of Lyon, France, on December 14, 1824. He was the son of a mining engineer and descended from an old noble family of Burgundy. He later added the ancestral "de Chavannes" to his name. Throughout his life, he spurned his Lyon origins, preferring to identify himself with the 'strong' blood of the Burgundians, where his father originated.

Puvis de Chavannes was educated at the Amiens College and at the Lycée Henri IV in Paris. He intended to follow his father's profession until a serious illness compelled him to convalesce at Mâcon with his brother and sister-in-law in 1844 and 1845, which interrupted his studies. A journey to Italy opened his mind to fresh ideas, and on his return to Paris in 1846, he announced his intention to become a painter.

He studied first under Eugène Delacroix, but only very briefly, as Delacroix closed his studio shortly afterwards due to ill health. He studied subsequently under Henri Scheffer and then Thomas Couture. His training was not classical as he found that he preferred to work alone. He took a large studio near the Gare de Lyon and attended anatomy classes at the Académie des Beaux Arts.  It was not until a number of years later, when the government of France acquired one of his works, that he gained wide recognition.

In 1850, Puvis de Chavannes made his Salon debut with Dead Christ, Jeune noir à l'épée (Black youth with a sword), The Reading Lesson, and Portrait of a Man.

Work 

Puvis de Chavannes's work is seen as symbolist in nature, even though he studied with some of the romanticists, and he is credited with influencing an entire generation of painters and sculptors, particularly the works of the Modernists. One of his protégés was Georges de Feure.

Mural work 

Puvis de Chavannes is best known for his mural painting, and came to be known as 'the painter for France.'  His first commission was for his brother's chateau, Le Brouchy, a medieval-style structure near Cuiseaux in Saône-et-Loire. The principal decorations take the four seasons as their theme. His first public commissions came early in the 1860s, with work at the Musée de Picardie at Amiens. The first four works were Concordia (1861), Bellum (1861), Le Travail (Work; 1863) and Le Repos (Rest; 1863).

The regions 
Over the course of his career, Puvis received a substantial number of commissions for works to be carried out in public and private institutions throughout France. His early work at the Musée de Picardie had helped him to develop his classicizing style, and the decorative aesthetic of his mural works.

Among his public works are the later cycles completed at Amiens (Ave Picardia Nutrix, 1865), at Marseille, at Lyon and at Poitiers.  Of particular importance is the cycle at the Palais de Beaux Arts in Lyon, which includes three significant works, filling the wall space in the main staircase.  From left to right, the works are Antique Vision (1884), The Wood Dear to the Arts and the Muses (1884), and Christian Inspiration (1884).

Paris 

Puvis' career was tied up with a complicated debate that had been ongoing since the beginning of the Third Republic (1870), and at the end of the violence of the Paris Commune. The question at stake was the identity of France and the meaning of 'Frenchness'. Royalists felt that the revolution of 1789 had been an immense disaster and that France had been thrown off course, while the Republicans felt that the Revolution had allowed France to revert to its true course. Consequently, works that were to be displayed in public spaces, such as murals, had the important task of fulfilling the ideology of the commissioning party. Many scholars of Puvis's works have noted that his success as a 'painter for France' was largely due to his ability to create works which were agreeable to the many ideologies in existence at this time.

His first Parisian commission was for a cycle at the church of Saint Genevieve, which is now the secular Pantheon, begun in 1874. His two subjects were L'Education de Sainte Geneviève and La Vie Pastoral de Sainte Geneviève. This commission was followed by works at the Sorbonne, namely the enormous hemicycle, The Sacred Grove or L'Ancienne Sorbonne amongst the muses in the Grand Amphitheater of the Sorbonne.

His final commission in this trinity of Republican commissions was the crowning glory of Puvis's career, the works Summer and Winter, at the  Hôtel de Ville (City Hall) in Paris.

Many of these works are characterized by their nod to classical art, visible in the careful balanced compositions, and the subject matter is frequently a direct reference to visions of Hellenistic Greece, particularly in the case of Antique Vision.

Works on canvas 

Puvis de Chavannes was president and co-founder in 1890 of the Société Nationale des Beaux-Arts (National Society of Fine Arts) founded in Paris. It became the dominant salon of art at the time and held exhibitions of contemporary art that was selected only by a jury composed of the officers of the Société.

Those who translated best the spirit of the work of Puvis de Chavannes in their own creations were, in Germany, the painter Ludwig von Hofmann and in France, Auguste Rodin.

His easel paintings also may be found in many American and European galleries. Some of these paintings are:
Death and the Maiden
The Dream
The Poor Fisherman, 1881, oil on canvas
Vigilance
The Meditation
Mary Magdalene at Saint Baume
Saint Genoveva
Young Girls at the Seaside, 1879, oil on canvas
Mad Woman at the Edge of the Sea
Hope
Hope (nude)
Kneeling nude woman, viewed from back
The Sacred Grove

As far as the appreciation of his life's work is concerned, Puvis de Chavannes was never properly understood by his contemporaries. At the beginning of his career, art criticism was divided into two camps. Adored by the idealists, he was despised by the partisans of the realists. Only with the advent of Symbolism did these two camps unite, but without achieving a convincing appreciation of the painter. Today's research has inherited this contradiction of art criticism and therefore still does not offer a convincing presentation of Puvis de Chavanne's art.

Personal life 
In Montmartre, he had an affair with one of his models, Suzanne Valadon, who would become one of the leading artists of the day as well as the mother, teacher, and mentor of Maurice Utrillo. From 1856, he was in a relationship with the Romanian princess, Marie Cantacuzène. The couple were together for 40 years, and were married before their deaths in 1898.

Puvis de Chavannes Prize
Beginning in 1926, The Prix Puvis de Chavannes (Puvis de Chavannes prize) was awarded by the National Society of Fine Arts (Société Nationale des Beaux-Arts). The Prix Puvis de Chavannes is the retrospective exhibition in Paris of the main works of the artist awarded the prize that year. During the twentieth century, this exhibition was located at the Grand Palais or the Musée d'Art Moderne. Recipients of the prize include:

 1941: Wilhem Van Hasselt
 1944: Jean Gabriel Domergue
 1948: Joseph Pinchon
 1952: Tristan Klingsor
 1955: Georges Delplanque
 1957: Albert Decaris
 1958: Jean Picard Le Doux
 1963: Maurice Boitel, 
 1966: Pierre Gaillardot
 1968: Pierre-Henry
 1969: Louis Vuillermoz
 1970: Daniel du Janerand
 1971: Jean-Pierre Alaux
 1975: Jean Monneret
 1987: André Hambourg
 1991: Gaston Sébire
 1993: Jean Cluseau-Lanauve
 2006: Paul Collomb

Gallery

See also

 Symbolism (arts)
 Boston Public Library
 List of European art awards
 Les Maîtres de l'Affiche

References

Sources

Further reading
 Paul Baudoüin, "Souvenirs sur Puvis de Chavannes", Gazette des Beaux-Arts, 6e période, tome XIII, janvier 1935, pp. 295-314.
 Manuel Mayer: Die erträumte Kunst Pierre Puvis de Chavannes’. Eine Studie zum Verhältnis von Forschung und Kunstkritik im Angesicht einer Malerei zwischen Staffelei- und Wandbild. Hrsg.: ART Dok. Publikationsplattform Kunst- und Bildwissenschaften der Universität Heidelberg. Heidelberg 2020. http://archiv.ub.uni-heidelberg.de/artdok/7008/7/Mayer_Die_ertraeumte_Kunst_Pierre_Puvis_de_Chavannes_2020.pdf
 Arcadia by the shore : the mythic world of Puvis de Chavannes, [Exhibotion Catalogue Katalog, Bunkamura Museum of Art (Tokyo), Shimane Art Museum (Matsue)], Aimée Brown-Price, with contribution by Bertrand Puvis de Chavannes, Tokyo/Matsue 2014.
 Aimée Brown-Price Pierre Puvis de Chavannes, 2 vols, New Haven/London 2010, Yale University Press.
 Kerstin Thomas: Welt und Stimmung bei Puvis de Chavannes, Seurat und Gauguin, Passagen/Passages Deutsches Forum für Kunstgeschichte, Berlin/Munich 2010.
 Puvis de Chavannes. Une voie singulière au siècle de l'Impressionnisme, [Exhibition Catalogue, Musée de Picardie Amiens], Matthieu Pinette, Amiens 2005.
 Jennifer L. Shaw Dream States. Puvis de Chavannes, Modernism, and the Fantasy of France, New Haven/London 2002.
 From Puvis de Chavannes to Matisse and Picasso: toward modern art, [Exhibition Catalogue, Palazzo Grassi], Serge Lemoine, Venice 2002.
 Puvis de Chavannes au musée des Beaux-Arts de Lyon, [Exhibition Catalogue, Musée des Beaux-Arts Lyon], Dominique Brachlianoff, Lyon 1998.
 Brian Petrie Puvis de Chavannes, Aldershot/Vermont 1997.
 Pierre Puvis de Chavannes, [Exhibition Catalogue, Van Gogh Museum, Amsterdam], Aimée Brown Price, Zwolle 1994.
 Robinson, W.H., 1991, ‘Puvis de Chavannes’s ‘Summer’ and the Symbolist Avant-Garde’, The Bulletin of the Cleveland Museum of Art, Vol. 78, No. 1 (Jan.) pp. 2–27
 Dictionnaire de la peinture française, Librairie Larousse, 1989/1991, Paris, 
 Stefan Germer Historizität und Autonomie. Studien zu Wandbildern im Frankreich des 19. Jahrhunderts. Ingres, Chassériau, Chenavard und Puvis de Chavannes, Studien zur Kunstgeschichte, vol 47, Hildesheim/Zurich/New York 1988.
 Puvis de Chavannes. 1824–1898, [Exhibition Catalogue, Grand Palais, Paris, Galerie nationale du Canada, Ottawa], Secrétariat d'État à la Culture und Éditions des Musées Nationaux, Louise d'Argencourt (Ottawa) and Jacques Foucart (Paris), Paris 1976 / The National Gallery of Canada, Ottawa 1977.
 Puvis de Chavannes and The Modern Tradition, [Exhibition Catalogue, Art Gallery of Ontario], Richard J. Wattenmaker, Toronto/Ontario 1975.
 Joseph Ishikawa Moderne Malgré Lui: The Phenomenon of Puvis de Chavannes, Art Journal 27:4, summer 1968.
 Robert Goldwater Puvis de Chavannes. Some Reasons for a Reputation, Art Bulletin 28, March 1946.
 René Jullian L'Oeuvre de jeunesse de Puvis de Chavannes, Gazette des beaux-arts, November 1938.
 Levin, M.R., 1986, Republican Art and Ideology in Late Nineteenth Century France, Ann Arbor: UMI Research Press
 Russell T. Clement Four French Symbolists. A Sourcebook on Pierre Puvis de Chavannes, Gustave Moreau, Odilon Redon, and Maurice Denis, Westport/London 1996.

External links

 Commercial Art Gallery Guide
 Pierre Puvis de Chavannes at artchive.com
 
 Jennifer A. Thompson, "Peace and War by Pierre Puvis de Chavannes (cat. 1062,1063)," in The John G. Johnson Collection: A History and Selected Works, a Philadelphia Museum of Art free digital publication

1824 births
1898 deaths
Artists from Lyon
19th-century French painters
French male painters
French Symbolist painters
Lycée Henri-IV alumni
Art educators
Commandeurs of the Légion d'honneur
Artists of the Boston Public Library
Symbolism (arts)
Burials at Neuilly-sur-Seine community cemetery
19th-century French male artists